Rajkumari Devi is an Indian farmer. She was awarded with India's fourth highest civilian award Padma Shri. Kisan Chachi was born in a poor Bihari family and due to family poverty she was get married in young age. After her marriage she formed self help groups and with the help of biological farming she gave job for many poor families. Bihar CM Nitish Kumar recognized her and awarded with Kisan Shri.

Early life 
Kisan Chachi is from Anandpur village located in Saraiya block of Muzaffarpur district in the state of Bihar. She completed her matriculation after her marriage. At this time she is an owner of Kisan Chachi Brand.

Awards 

Padma Shri
Kisan Shri

References

Indian activists
Indian farmers
Indian women activists
Indian women farmers
People from Muzaffarpur district
Recipients of the Padma Shri in other fields
Living people
Year of birth missing (living people)